Promocoderus is a genus of beetles in the family Carabidae, containing the following species:

 Promecoderus albaniensis Castelnau, 1867
 Promecoderus anguliceps Sloane, 1898
 Promecoderus bassi Castelnau, 1867
 Promecoderus blackburni Sloane, 1890
 Promecoderus brunnicornis Dejean, 1829
 Promecoderus castelnaui Sloane, 1892
 Promecoderus clivinoides Guerin-Meneville, 1841
 Promecoderus comes Sloane, 1890
 Promecoderus concolor Germar, 1848
 Promecoderus cordicollis Sloane, 1908
 Promecoderus curvipes Sloane, 1920
 Promecoderus distinctus Sloane, 1890
 Promecoderus dorsalis MacLeay, 1873
 Promecoderus dyschiroides Guerin-Meneville, 1841
 Promecoderus elegans Castelnau, 1867
 Promecoderus gibbosus (Gray, 1832)
 Promecoderus hunteriensis MacLeay, 1873
 Promecoderus inornatus MacLeay, 1873
 Promecoderus insignis Sloane, 1890
 Promecoderus intermedius Sloane, 1898
 Promecoderus interruptus MacLeay, 1873
 Promecoderus leai Sloane, 1898 
 Promecoderus lottini Brulle, 1834
 Promecoderus maritimus Castelnau, 1867
 Promecoderus mastersii MacLeay, 1873
 Promecoderus modestus Castelnau, 1867
 Promecoderus neglectus Castelnau, 1867
 Promecoderus nigellus Sloane, 1890
 Promecoderus nigricornis Castelnau, 1867
 Promecoderus olivaceous MacLeay, 1873
 Promecoderus ovipennis Sloane, 1898
 Promecoderus pacificus Sloane, 1890 
 Promecoderus pygmaeus Castelnau, 1867 
 Promecoderus riverinae MacLeay, 1873
 Promecoderus scauroides Castelnau, 1867
 Promecoderus semistriatus Castelnau, 1867
 Promecoderus sloanei Blackburn, 1901 
 Promecoderus striatopunctatus Castelnau, 1867
 Promecoderus subdepressus Guerin-Meneville, 1841 
 Promecoderus viridiaeneus Sloane, 1915 
 Promecoderus wilcoxii Castelnau, 1867

References

Broscinae